The Nimitz Glacier is an Antarctic glacier,  long and  wide, draining the area about  west of the Vinson Massif and flowing southeast between the Sentinel Range and Bastien Range to enter Minnesota Glacier, in the central Ellsworth Mountains.

Discovered by USN Squadron VX-6 on photographic flights of December 14-December 15, 1959, and mapped by United States Geological Survey from these photos. Named by US-ACAN for Fleet Admiral Chester Nimitz, USN, who as Chief of Naval Operations at the time of Operation Highjump, 1947–1948, made possible that unprecedentedly large and complex Antarctic expedition.

Tributary glaciers
 Karasura Glacier
 Branscomb Glacier
 Cairns Glacier
 Tulaczyk Glacier
 Zapol Glacier
 Donnellan Glacier
 Gildea Glacier
 Bender Glacier
 Sirma Glacier

See also
 List of glaciers in the Antarctic
 Glaciology

Maps
 Vinson Massif.  Scale 1:250 000 topographic map.  Reston, Virginia: US Geological Survey, 1988.
 D. Gildea and C. Rada.  Vinson Massif and the Sentinel Range.  Scale 1:50 000 topographic map.  Omega Foundation, 2007.
 Antarctic Digital Database (ADD). Scale 1:250000 topographic map of Antarctica. Scientific Committee on Antarctic Research (SCAR). Since 1993, regularly updated.

References

Glaciers of Ellsworth Land
Ellsworth Mountains